Mariano Ching is a Chinese–Filipino artist, painter, illustrator, and photographer. His works have been exhibited in Philippines, France, Singapore, Malaysia and United States.

Biography

Mariano's first experience with art was at four years old, when a cousin taught him how to draw simple shapes. He and his brother, Jonathan Ching, who would also grow up to become an artist, spent most of their time inside drawing instead of playing outside. Mariano was greatly influenced by the anime Mazinger Z and Voltes V which were widely popular during his youth. They would significantly affect his future works. In his high school years, his parents reminded him to think carefully about his future career. They said there was no money in art and that he should consider a career in medicine or engineering instead and make art as a hobby.

Despite his parents' constant reminder, Mariano eventually pursued the road towards becoming an artist. While he was an engineering student at the University of the Philippines, Mariano also enrolled in a lot of art workshops to hone his skills. One of these workshops proved to be a turning point. He was on his fourth year in engineering when he attended an art workshop headed by Elemer Borogan and Gina Morales. The art style of the paintings so touched him that he decided to shift to painting as his major. During his years in University of the Philippines College of Fine Arts, he co-founded the art group Surrounded by Water. There, he met his future wife, Yasmin Sison, who was also a member of Surrounded by Water. At that time Mariano was still relatively new at the art scene and had not yet garnered recognition.

In 1998, Mariano won his first major award. His illustration work for the book entitled Mayroon Akong Alagang Puno won the Alcala Illustrators' Prize, the grand prize awarded by the Philippine Board on Books For Young People (PBBY), a nonprofit and non-governmental organization committed to the development of children's literature in the Philippines. The award included a cash prize of P25,000.00, a gold medal, and an opportunity for the book to be published.

In 2001, he won the award again with the book entitled Bakit Matagal ang Sundo Ko?. [right side table style with following input lower part] Cover Illustration for Bakit Matagal ang Sundo Ko?" 2001. {insert} photo}

In 2002, he won the Monbusho Scholarship. The Monbusho scholarship is given to foreigners under the Japanese government to study in Japan. He became a grant awardee as a research student in Kyoto University. He majored in printmaking, specializing in Japanese woodblock printmaking.

In 2006, Mariano Ching received the Thirteen Artist Award given by the Cultural Center of the Philippines (CCP).

Surrounded By Water

The art group Surrounded by Water was founded by Wire Tuazon. The group was named "Surrounded by Water" after the first gallery that was held in Angono, Rizal. Its concept is based on Neo-Angono. The group moved the Surrounded by Water gallery to Mandaluyong. They established a concept that is based on emerging and experimental art in and around Manila. They exhibited art that is not regularly shown in galleries and there were few galleries that took in emerging young artists.

Members

1. Wire Tuazon
2. Keiye Tuazon
3. Mariano Ching
4. Yasmin Sison
5. Jonathan Ching
5. Geraldine Javier
7. Lena Cobangbang
8. Jason Oliveria
9. Louie Cordero
10. Eduardo Enriquez
11. Amiel Roldan
12. Mike Munoz
13. Cristina Dy

List of major and minor exhibitions

Individual exhibitions

Group exhibitions

References

Website

Books
Philippines Year Book 2009: 61 Artist that will Change the World pp.106, 108

External links
Manila Art Blogger
Magnet Galleries

Filipino illustrators
Filipino painters
Filipino people of Chinese descent
Filipino photographers
Kyoto University alumni
Living people
University of the Philippines Diliman alumni
Year of birth missing (living people)